Melinopterus prodromus is a species of scarab beetle in the family Scarabaeidae. It is found in the Palearctic and in North America, where it is an exotic species.

This species was formerly a member of the genus Aphodius.

References

External links

 

Scarabaeidae
Beetles of North Africa
Beetles of Asia
Beetles of Europe
Taxa named by Nikolaus Joseph Brahm
Beetles described in 1790